Elizabeth Wong is a contemporary American playwright, television writer, librettist, theatrical director, college professor, social essayist, and a writer of plays for young audiences. Her critically acclaimed plays include China Doll (An Imagined Life of an American Actress) is a fictional tale of the actress, Anna May Wong; and Letters to A Student Revolutionary, a story of two friends during the Tiananmen Square protests of 1989.  Wong has written for television on All American Girl, starring Margaret Cho. She is a visiting lecturer at the College of Creative Studies, University of California, Santa Barbara, where her papers are archived, an adjunct professor at the University of Southern California, USC School of Theater, and an associate professor at Boston Conservatory at Berklee. She holds a Master of Fine Arts degree from New York University Tisch School of the Arts, Dramatic Writing Program (1991) and a Bachelor of Arts degree in English and Broadcast Journalism from the University of Southern California (1980). She studied playwriting with Tina Howe, Maria Irene Fornes and Mac Wellman.

Selected plays
 Letters to a Student Revolutionary (Pan Asian Repertory Theatre, 1991), (New York Times Review 5/16/1991)
 Kimchee & Chitlins (West Coast Ensemble, 1994), (Los Angeles Times feature article 5/26/1992 
 China Doll (Northwest Asian American Theatre, 1996)
 Let the Big Dog Eat (short play) (Humana Festival, Actors Theater of Louisville, 1998)
 Amazing Adventures of the Marvelous Monkey King (children's play) (Denver Center for the Performing Arts, 1991)
 Prometheus (children's play) (Denver Center Theater for the Performing Arts, 1999)
 The Happy Prince (children's play)
 Boid & Oskar (children's play) (Cincinnati Playhouse in the Park)
 Aftermath of a Chinese Banquet
 Bill of (W)Rights (Minneapolis' Mixed Blood Theater, 2004)
 Alice Downsized
 Dating & Mating in Modern Times (Theatre Emory, 2003)
 The Concubine Spy
 Badass of the RIP Eternal (short play) (Actors Theatre of Louisville, Humana Festival, part of "Heaven and Hell on Earth: A Divine Comedy," 2002)
 Bu and Bun
 Inside the Red Envelope
 Quickdraw Grandma (2004)
 Punk Girls
 Reveries of an Amorous Woman
 Love Life of a Chinese Eunuch (2004)
 Ibong Adarna: Fabulous Filipino Folktale (children's play) (Mu Performing Arts, 2006)
 Finding Your Inner Zulu (short play) (Silk Road Theatre Project, part of "The DNA Trail," 2010),
 The Magical Bird: A Fabulous Filipino Folktail (musical), (Honolulu Theatre for Youth, 2007); Honolulu Star-News Bulletin review 4/27/07 
 The Happy Prince (musical/opera), based on her adaptation (children's play) (From Page-to-Stage/Prelude New Play Festival, Kennedy Center for the Performing Arts, 2003)

Selected awards

 Tanne Foundation Award (2007) for artistic achievement
 Board of Supervisors, County of Los Angeles, Letter of Commendation (2009) for human rights advocacy
 Outstanding Playwright Award (2009), Asian Pacific American Friends of Theatre
 The Mark David Cohen National Playwriting Award (2001), Kennedy Center for the Performing Arts
 Lazarus New Play Prize for Young Audiences (1999)
 Jane Chambers Playwriting Award (1998), Kennedy Center's American College Theatre Festival and Association for Theatre in Higher Education

References

External links
 Official Website

American dramatists and playwrights of Chinese descent
American writers of Chinese descent
Living people
University of Southern California alumni
Tisch School of the Arts alumni
American women dramatists and playwrights
USC Annenberg School for Communication and Journalism alumni
Year of birth missing (living people)